Bojan Madzovski (born 8 May 1994) is a Macedonian handball player for RK Eurofarm Pelister 2 and the North Macedonian national team.

He represented North Macedonia at the 2020 European Men's Handball Championship.

His twin brother Borjan Madzovski is also a handball player.

References

External links

1994 births
Living people
Macedonian male handball players
Sportspeople from Skopje
Macedonian twins
Mediterranean Games competitors for North Macedonia
Competitors at the 2018 Mediterranean Games